Incoming may refer to:
 Incoming (1998 video game), a 3D shooter developed by Rage Software for the PC and Dreamcast.
 Incoming (album), an album by British band Blue October, 1998
 Incoming! (2009 video game), a video game for WiiWare developed by JV Games
 Incoming (play), a 2011 play by Andrew Motion
 Incoming, a 2018 American film starring Scott Adkins